Kim Nam-joo (born May 10, 1971) is a South Korean actress. Kim rose to stardom in the 1990s in television series such as Model, The Boss and Her House. After 2001, Kim went into semi-retirement, only appearing in commercials, particularly after she married actor Kim Seung-woo in 2005 and they started a family. Then in 2009, she made her comeback with Queen of Housewives, written by Park Ji-eun. Housewives was a rating hit, and Kim went on to collaborate with Park on Queen of Reversals (2010) and top-rated series My Husband Got a Family, which established Kim's continuing star status. In 2018, Kim received critical acclaim for her role in the series Misty.

Early life
Kim was born in Seoul, South Korea. When she was two years old, her father's business failed, which resulted in the family moving to Pyeongtaek, Gyeonggi Province, where Kim spent her childhood and adolescence. After graduating from high school, she enrolled as a Dance major at Suwon Women's College. When she was a sophomore, Kim joined the Miss Korea pageant, and the experience led her to quit school to pursue modeling in September 1992.

Career
Kim won fourth place in a talent search by broadcaster SBS in 1994, and quickly became a popular television star in her twenties. Her characters in the hit TV series City Men and Women (1996), Model (1997), The Boss (1999) and Her House (2001), made her the epitome of a sophisticated, urban career woman in 1990s Korea. But after Her House, Kim went into semi-retirement, only appearing in lucrative commercials, mostly for cosmetics and luxury goods. She married actor Kim Seung-woo in 2005, and for several years she lived as a full-time housewife and mother.

In 2007, she stretched some acting muscle opposite Sol Kyung-gu in Voice of a Murderer, about the tormenting and ultimately unsuccessful attempts of two parents to bring their kidnapped son back home. Based on the true story of a nine-year-old child found dead in 1991, the film faithfully follows the harrowing 44-day quest to find the missing boy.

Kim made a successful television comeback in Queen of Housewives (also known as My Wife is a Superwoman) in 2009. A comedy drama that depicts the life of housewives who devote their entire lives to their husbands' success, it became one of the most-watched shows during its run, topping Korea's TV ratings charts for three consecutive weeks. It also created new trends among married women in terms of confidence, fashion and makeup. Kim's character Chun Ji-ae was once the most popular girl in high school, and she's determined to help her smart but clueless husband climb the corporate ladder once she realizes that he is an underperformer at work. Chun meets her match, however, when she discovers that his boss is the husband of her high school frenemy. Her portrayal of a modern Korean housewife won Kim numerous accolades.

Kim reunited with Queen of Housewives writer Park Ji-eun in another workplace romantic dramedy, the 2010s Queen of Reversals. This time Kim played a strong and decisive character, a careerwoman, trying to balance work and married life. Her character Hwang Tae-hee experiences the many ups, downs, and reversals of work, family, and romance as she falls in and out of love and marriage. Ratings-wise Queen of Reversals was less successful than its predecessor, though Kim was awarded the highest award (Daesang or "Grand Prize") at MBC's year-end drama awards ceremony.

She also released her book that year, called Kim Nam-joo's House. The collection of essays and photographs is a candid discussion of her family life and home.

Kim then led the 2012 weekend family drama My Husband Got a Family (also known as You Who Rolled in Unexpectedly and Unexpected You), which took a comedic and serious approach to the trials and tribulations of a TV director dealing with her in-laws when her husband reunites with his biological parents. Kim and Park's third collaboration was a big hit with audiences, it was number one on the 2012 yearly TV ratings chart with average ratings of 33.1 percent and a ratings peak of 52.3 percent, and Kim won another Daesang at the KBS Drama Awards.

Kim returned to television after a six-year hiatus, starring in the romance thriller, Misty. The drama was both a ratings and critical success and Kim earned praise for her portrayal of a controversial character.

The popularity of TV dramas that portray the lives of working women in their 30s and 40s represents a larger trend in Korean culture, mainly a reflection of women marrying at a later age and working more in their 20s. Kim is now considered one of the few established Korean actresses in their 30s, 40s and even 50s who have held on to the spotlight, reversing an ageist trend that dictated casting for decades.

Filmography

Television series

Film

Variety show

Book

Awards and nominations

Listicles

References

External links

 

20th-century South Korean actresses
21st-century South Korean actresses
South Korean television actresses
South Korean film actresses
South Korean female models
South Korean Roman Catholics
Miss Korea delegates
Kyung Hee University alumni
Actresses from Pyeongtaek
1971 births
Living people
Best Actress Paeksang Arts Award (television) winners